The 2018 F4 Danish Championship season was the second season of the F4 Danish Championship. The season began at Padborg Park in April and concluded at Jyllandsringen in October.

Teams and drivers
All teams were Danish-registered.

Calendar and results

Race results

Championship standings

Points are awarded to the top 10 classified finishers in each race. No points are awarded for pole position or fastest lap.

Drivers' standings

Notes:
† – Drivers did not finish the race, but were classified as they completed over 75% of the race distance.

Teams' championship

Footnotes

References

External links
 

Danish F4 Championship
F4 Danish Championship
F4 Danish Championship seasons
Danish F4